HMAS Whang Pu (FY-03) or SS Wang Phu was a 3,204 ton riverboat of the China Navigation Company that was commissioned into the Royal Australian Navy (RAN) in the Second World War. Her Chinese name translates to "Happy Times". She was one of a group of vessels called the "China Fleet" requisitioned for the RAN in similar circumstances.

Pre-war service
The Taikoo Dockyard and Engineering Company, Hong Kong built Wang Phu in 1920 for the China Navigation Company. Both Taikoo Dockyard and CNC were owned by John Swire and Sons Ltd, which is British-owned but based in Hong Kong.

War service
The Admiralty requisitioned Whang Pu on 31 December 1941 and work started at Singapore to convert her into a submarine depot ship for the Royal Navy. However, this coincided with the Japanese invasion of Malaya and in January 1942 work on Wang Phu was stopped. She sailed to Fremantle, Western Australia where she served as a depot ship for Royal Netherlands Navy submarine and minesweeper crews.

She was commissioned into the Royal Australian Navy on 1 October 1943 as HMAS Whang Pu and fitted out in Melbourne as a mobile repair ship. She served in New Guinea waters and later at Morotai in the Dutch East Indies as a stores ship. After the war she sailed to Hong Kong where she was paid off on 22 April 1946 and returned to her owners.

Post-war
She was then used as an accommodation ship, and in November 1949 was sold for breaking up.

See also
 Allied Chinese Ships

Notes

 

1920 ships
Auxiliary ships of the Royal Australian Navy
Ships built in Hong Kong
Swire Group
Ships built by the Taikoo Dockyard and Engineering Company